Claude Cahun (born Lucy Renee Mathilde Schwob; 25 October 1894 – 8 December 1954) was a French surrealist photographer, sculptor, and writer.

Schwob adopted the pseudonym Claude Cahun in 1914. Cahun is best known as a writer and self-portraitist, who assumed a variety of performative personae.

In her writing she consistently referred to herself as "elle" (she), and this article follows her practice; but she also said that her actual gender was fluid. For example, in Disavowals, Cahun writes: "Masculine? Feminine? It depends on the situation.  is the only gender that always suits me."

During World War II, Cahun was also active as a resistance worker and propagandist.

Early life
Cahun was born in Nantes in 1894, into a well-off literary Jewish family. Avant-garde writer Marcel Schwob was her uncle and Orientalist David Léon Cahun was her great-uncle. When Cahun was four years old, her mother, Mary-Antoinette Courbebaisse, began suffering from mental illness, which ultimately led to her mother's permanent internment at a psychiatric facility.  In her mother's absence, Cahun was brought up by her grandmother, Mathilde.

Cahun attended a private school (Parsons Mead School) in Surrey after experiences with antisemitism at high school in Nantes. She attended the University of Paris, Sorbonne. She began making photographic self-portraits as early as 1912 (aged 18), and continued taking images of herself throughout the 1930s.

Around 1914, she changed her name to Claude Cahun, after having previously used the names Claude Courlis (after the curlew) and Daniel Douglas (after Lord Alfred Douglas). During the early 1920s, she settled in Paris with lifelong partner Suzanne Malherbe, who adopted the pseudonym Marcel Moore. The two became step-sisters in 1917 after Cahun's divorced father and Moore's widowed mother married, eight years after Cahun and Moore's artistic and romantic partnership began. For the rest of their lives together, Cahun and Moore collaborated on various written works, sculptures, photomontages and collages. The two published articles and novels, notably in the periodical Mercure de France, and befriended Henri Michaux, Pierre Morhange, and Robert Desnos.

Around 1922 Cahun and Moore began holding artists' salons at their home. Among the regulars who would attend were artists Henri Michaux and André Breton and literary entrepreneurs Sylvia Beach and Adrienne Monnier.

Work

Cahun's works encompassed writing, photography, and theatre, of which the most remembered are the highly staged self-portraits and tableaux that incorporated the visual aesthetics of Surrealism. During the 1920s, Cahun produced an astonishing number of self-portraits in various guises such as aviator, dandy, doll, body builder, vamp and vampire, angel, and Japanese puppet.

Some of Cahun's portraits feature the artist looking directly at the viewer, head shaved, often revealing only head and shoulders (eliminating body from the view), and a blurring of gender indicators and behaviors which serve to undermine the patriarchal gaze. Scholar Miranda Welby-Everard has written about the importance of theatre, performance, and costume that underlies Cahun's work, suggesting how this may have informed the artist's varying gender presentations.

Cahun's published writings include "Heroines," (1925) a series of monologues based upon female fairy tale characters intertwined with witty comparisons to the contemporary image of women; Aveux non avenus, (Carrefour, 1930) a book of essays and recorded dreams illustrated with photomontages; and several essays in magazines and journals.

In 1932, Cahun joined the Association des Écrivains et Artistes Révolutionnaires, where she met André Breton and René Crevel. Following this, Cahun began associating with the surrealist group and later participated in a number of surrealist exhibitions, including the London International Surrealist Exhibition (New Burlington Gallery) and Exposition surréaliste d'Objets (Charles Ratton Gallery, Paris), both in 1936.  Cahun's photograph from the London exhibition of Sheila Legge standing in the middle of Trafalgar Square, her head obscured by a flower arrangement and pigeons perching on her outstretched arms, appeared in numerous newspapers and was later reproduced in a number of books. In 1934, Cahun published a short polemic essay, Les Paris sont Ouverts, and in 1935 took part in the founding of the left-wing anti-fascist alliance Contre Attaque, alongside André Breton and Georges Bataille. Breton called Cahun "one of the most curious spirits of our time."

In 1994, the Institute of Contemporary Arts in London held an exhibition of Cahun's photographic self-portraits from 1927–47, alongside the work of two young contemporary British artists, Virginia Nimarkoh and Tacita Dean, entitled Mise en Scene. In the surrealist self-portraits, Cahun represented herself as an androgyne, nymph, model, and soldier.

In 2007, David Bowie created a multi-media exhibition of Cahun's work in the gardens of the General Theological Seminary in New York. It was part of a venue called the Highline Festival, which also included offerings by Air, Laurie Anderson, and Mike Garson. Bowie said of Cahun:

You could call her transgressive or you could call her a cross-dressing Man Ray with surrealist tendencies. I find this work really quite mad, in the nicest way. Outside of France and now the UK she has not had the kind of recognition that, as a founding follower, friend and worker of the original Surrealist movement, she surely deserves.

Collaboration with Marcel Moore 
Cahun's work was often a collaboration with Marcel Moore. Cahun and Moore collaborated frequently, though this often goes unrecognized. It is believed that Moore was often the person standing behind the camera during Cahun's portrait shoots and was an equal partner in Cahun's collages.

With the majority of the photographs attributed to Cahun coming from a personal collection, not one meant for public display, it has been proposed that these personal photographs allowed for Cahun to experiment with gender presentation and the role of the viewer to a greater degree.

World War II activism
In 1937 Cahun and Moore settled in Jersey. Following the fall of France and the German occupation of Jersey and the other Channel Islands, they became active as resistance workers and propagandists. Fervently against war, the two worked extensively in producing anti-German fliers. Many were snippets from English-to-German translations of BBC reports on the Nazis' crimes and insolence, which were pasted together to create rhythmic poems and harsh criticism. They created many of these messages under the German pseudonym Der Soldat Ohne Namen, or The Soldier With No Name, to deceive German soldiers that there was a conspiracy among the occupation troops. The couple then dressed up and attended many German military events in Jersey, strategically placing their pamphlets in soldier's pockets, on their chairs, and in cigarette boxes for soldiers to find. Additionally, they inconspicuously crumpled up and threw their fliers into cars and windows.

On one occasion, they hung a banner in a local church which read “Jesus is great, but Hitler is greater – because Jesus died for people, but people die for Hitler.”  As with much of Cahun and Moore's artistic work in Paris, many of their notes also used this same style of dark humor. In many ways, Cahun and Moore's resistance efforts were not only political but artistic actions, using their creative talents to manipulate and undermine the authority which they despised. In many ways, Cahun's life's work was focused on undermining a certain authority; however, their activism posed a threat to their physical safety. As historian Jeffrey H. Jackson writes in his definitive study of their wartime resistance Paper Bullets, for Cahun and Moore, “fighting the German occupation of Jersey was the culmination of lifelong patterns of resistance, which had always borne a political edge in the cause of freedom as they carved out their own rebellious way of living in the world together.  For them, the political was always deeply personal.”

In 1944, Cahun and Moore were arrested and sentenced to death, but the sentence was never carried out, as the island was liberated from German occupation in 1945. However, Cahun's health never recovered from her treatment in jail, and she died in 1954. Cahun is buried in St Brelade's Church with partner Marcel Moore. At the trial, Cahun said to the German judge (according to the documentary on the Occupation of the Channel Islands, presented by John Nettles) that the Germans would have to shoot her twice, as she was not only a Resister but a Jew. This apparently brought a peal of laughter from the court and is said to have been one reason the execution was not carried out (Martin Sugarman, AJEX Archivist).

Social critique and legacy

Cahun made work for herself and did not want to be famous. It wasn't until 40 years after her death that Cahun's work became recognized. In many ways, Cahun's life was marked by actions which revolted against convention and her public image has since become a commentary which challenges the public's notions of gender, beauty, and logic.

Her work was meant to unsettle the audience's understanding of photography as a documentation of reality. Furthermore, her poetry challenged gender roles of the time and attacked the increasingly modern world's social and economic boundaries.

Also, Cahun's participation with the Parisian Surrealist group brought an element of diversity to the group's output which ushered in new representations. Most Surrealist artists were men, whose primary images of women depicted them as isolated symbols of eroticism rather than as the chameleonic, gender non-conforming figure that Cahun presented. Cahun’s photographs, writings, and general life as an artistic and political revolutionary continues to influence artists.

Cahun's collected writings were published in 2002 as Claude Cahun – Écrits, edited by François Leperlier.

In 2018, a street of Paris took the name of "Allée Claude Cahun – Marcel Moore" (area of Saint-Germain-des-Prés – Montparnasse, near the rue Notre-Dame-des-Champs where Claude and Suzanne lived).

Rupert Thomson's 2018 novel, Never Anyone But You, was based on the life of Cahun and Moore. It was favourably reviewed by Adam Mars-Jones in the London Review of Books.

Cahun and Moore's WWII activism and heroism are documented by Jeffrey H. Jackson in the 2020 book, Paper Bullets: Two Artists Who Risked Their Lives to Defy the Nazis.

Google honored Claude Cahun by showing an animated Doodle on its home page in many countries on October 25, 2021, on the anniversary of what would have been her 127th birthday.

Bibliography
 Vues et Visions (Pseudonym Claude Courlis), Mercure de France, No. 406, 16 May 1914
 Electronic edition on Bibliothèque Nationale Gallica
 La 'Salomé' d'Oscar Wilde. Le procés Billing et les 47000 pervertis du Livre noir, Mercure de France, No. 481, 1 July 1918
 Electronic edition on Bibliothèque Nationale Gallica
 Le poteau frontière (Pseudonym Daniel Douglas), La Gerbe, No. 3, December 1918
 Electronic edition on Bibliothèque Nationale Gallica
 Au plus beau des anges (Pseudonym Daniel Douglas), La Gerbe, No. 3, December 1918
 Electronic edition on Bibliothèque Nationale Gallica
 Cigarettes (Pseudonym Daniel Douglas), La Gerbe, No. 3, December 1918
 Electronic edition on Bibliothèque Nationale Gallica
 Aux Amis des livres, La Gerbe, No. 5, February 1919
 Electronic edition on Bibliothèque Nationale Gallica
 La Sorbonne en robe de fête (Pseudonym Daniel Douglas), La Gerbe, No. 5, February 1919
 Electronic edition on Bibliothèque Nationale Gallica
 La possession du Monde, par Georges Duhamel, La Gerbe, No. 7, April 1919
 Electronic edition on Bibliothèque Nationale Gallica
 Les Gerbes (Pseudonym Daniel Douglas), La Gerbe, No. 7, April 1919
 Electronic edition on Bibliothèque Nationale Gallica
 L'amour aveugle (Pseudonym Daniel Douglas), La Gerbe, No. 12, September 1919
 La machine magique (Pseudonym Daniel Douglas), La Gerbe, No. 12, September 1919
 Mathilde Alanic. Les roses refleurissent, Le Phare de la Loire, 29 June 1919
 Le théâtre de mademoiselle, par Mathias Morhardt, Le Phare de la Loire, 20 July 1919
 Vues et Visions, with Illustrations by Marcel Moore, Paris: Georges Crès & Cie, 1919
 Paraboles (Pseudonym Daniel Douglas), La Gerbe, No. 17, February 1920
 Une conférence de Georges Duhamel (Pseudonym Daniel Douglas), La Gerbe, No. 19, April 1920
 Marcel Schwob, La Gerbe, No. 20, May 1920
 Boxe (Pseudonym Daniel Douglas), La Gerbe, No. 22, July 1920
 Electronic edition on Bibliothèque Nationale Gallica
 Old Scotch Whisky, La Gerbe, No. 27, December 1920
 Electronic edition on Bibliothèque Nationale Gallica
 A propos d'une conference and Méditations à la faveur d'un Jazz Band, La Gerbe, No. 27, December 1920
 Electronic edition on Bibliothèque Nationale Gallica
 Héroïnes: 'Eve la trop crédule', 'Dalila, femme entre les femmes', 'La Sadique Judith', 'Hélène la rebelle', 'Sapho l'incomprise', 'Marguerite, sœur incestueuse', 'Salomé la sceptique', Mercure de France, No. 639, 1 February 1925
 Electronic edition on Bibliothèque Nationale Gallica
 Héroïnes: 'Sophie la symboliste', 'la Belle', Le Journal littéraire, No. 45, 28 February 1925
 Méditation de Mademoiselle Lucie Schwob, Philosophies, No. 5/6, March 1925
 Récits de rêve, in the special edition Les rêves, Le Disque vert, Third year, Book 4, No. 2, 1925
 Carnaval en chambre, La Ligne de cœur, Book 4, March 1926
 Ephémérides, Mercure de France, No. 685, 1 January 1927
 Electronic edition on Bibliothèque Nationale Gallica
 Au Diable, Le Plateau, No. 2, May–June 1929
 Ellis, Havelock: La Femme dans la société – I. L'Hygiene sociale, translated by Lucy Schwob, Mercure de France, 1929
 Aveux non avenus, illustrated by Marcel Moore, Paris: Editions du Carrefour, 30 May 1930
 Review on Bibliothèque Nationale Gallica
 Frontière Humaine, self-portrait, Bifur, No. 5, April 1930
 Protestez (AEAR), Feuille rouge, No. 2, March 1933
 Contre le fascisme Mays aussi contre l'impérialisme francais (AEAR), Feuille rouge, No. 4, May 1933
 Les Paris sont ouvert, Paris: José Corti, May 1934
 Union de lutte des intellectuels révolutionnaires, Contre-Attaque, 7 October 1935
 Prenez garde aux objets domestique, Cahier d'Art I-II, 1936
 Sous le feu des canons francais ... et alliés, Contre-Attaque, March 1936
 Dissolution de Contre-Attaque, L'Œuvre, 24 March 1936
 Exposition surréaliste d'objets, Exhibition at the Charles Ratton Gallery, Paris, 22–29 May 1936. Items listed by Claude Cahun are Un air de famille and Souris valseuses
 Il n'y a pas de liberté pour les ennemis de la liberté, 20 July 1936
 Deharme, Lise: Le Cœur de Pic, 32 illustrated with 20 photos by Claude Cahun, Paris: José Cortis, 1937
 Adhésion à la Fédération Internationale de l'Art Révolutionnaire Indépendant, Clé, No. 1, January 1939
 À bas les lettres de cachets! À bas la terreur grise! (FIARI), June 1939

References

Sources
 Claude Cahun info page
 Claude Cahun tribute and biography page
 The Daily Beast, 2015-04-21, "Claude Cahun: The Lesbian Surrealist Who Defied the Nazis"
 Feminist Art Archive, University of Washington, 2012, "Claude Cahun"
 Bower, Gavin James. "Claude Cahun: Finding a Lost Great." The Guardian. Guardian News and Media, 14 Feb. 2012. Web. 11 Dec. 2012
 Elkin, Lauren. "Reading Claude Cahun." Quarterly Conversation RSS. Quarterly Conversation RSS, n.d. Web. 11 Dec. 2012
 Gen, Doy. "Meta: Claude Cahun-A Sensual Politics of Photography." Meta-Magazine.com. Mega, n.d. Web. 11 Dec. 201
 The Guerilla Girls. "The 20th Century: Women of Isms." The Guerrilla Girls’ Bedside Companion to the History of Western Art. New York: Penguin Group, 1998. 62–63. Print
 Shaw, Jennifer. Exist Otherwise: The Life and Works of Claude Cahun. United Kingdom: Reaktion Books, May 2017. Print.
 Zachmann, Gayle. The Photographic Intertext: Invisible Adventures in the Work of Claude Cahun. 3rd ed. Vol. 10. N.p.: Taylor and Francis Group, 2006. CrossRef. Web. 11 Dec. 2012.
Jackson, Jeffrey H., Paper Bullets: Two Artists Who Risked Their Lives to Defy the Nazis.  New York:  Algonquin Books, 2020.  .

External links
 
 Claude Cahun at Tate
 De l'Éros des femmes surréalistes et de Claude Cahun en particulier by Georgina M.M. Colvile (in French)
 Prof. Gen Doy on Claude Cahun
 

French photographers
French surrealist artists
1894 births
1954 deaths
French women photographers
French women sculptors
Feminist artists
French lesbian artists
French lesbian writers
Women surrealist artists
French LGBT photographers
French LGBT sculptors
20th-century French Jews
Jewish feminists
Jewish artists
French people of Jewish descent
Artists from Nantes
Lesbian Jews
People from Saint Saviour, Jersey
20th-century French non-fiction writers
20th-century photographers
20th-century French women artists
20th-century French women writers
People educated at Parsons Mead School
French women in World War II
French Resistance members
Jews in the French resistance
Lesbian memoirists
Lesbian photographers
Lesbian sculptors
Female-to-male cross-dressers
20th-century women photographers
20th-century French LGBT people
Non-binary artists
Non-binary photographers